Pytel is a Polish/Ukrainian (Cyrillic: Питeль) surname. Notable people with the surname include:

 Daniel Pytel, Polish speedway rider
 Thomas Pytel, Polish-American programmer, better known as Tran / Renaissance in the demoscene
 Walenty Pytel, Polish born contemporary artist based in Britain
 Krzysztof Pytel, Polish cheers player
 Gergő Pytel, Hungarian badminton player
 Jamie Pytel, Canada litigation lawyer